Estonians or Estonian people are a Finnic ethnic group native to Estonia who speak the Estonian language.

The Estonian language is spoken as the first language by the vast majority of Estonians; it is closely related to other Finnic languages, e.g. Finnish, Karelian and Livonian. The Finnic languages are a subgroup of the larger Uralic family of languages, which also includes, e.g., the Sami languages. These languages are markedly different from most other native languages spoken in Europe, most of which have been assigned to Indo-European family of languages. Estonians can also be classified into subgroups according to dialects (e.g., Võros, Setos), although such divisions have become less pronounced due to internal migration and rapid urbanisation in Estonia in the 20th century.

There are approximately 1 million ethnic Estonians worldwide with vast majority of them residing in their native Estonia. Estonian diaspora communities formed primarily in Finland, the United States, Sweden, Canada, the United Kingdom and European Union member states.

History

Prehistoric roots
Estonia was first inhabited about 10,000 years ago, soon after the ice from the Baltic Ice Lake had melted. Living in the same area for more than 5,000 years would put the ancestors of Estonians among the oldest permanent inhabitants in Europe.  On the other hand, some recent linguistic estimations suggest that Finno-Ugric language speakers arrived around the Baltic Sea considerably later, perhaps during the Early Bronze Age (ca. 1800 BCE).

It was used up until the mid-19th century, when it was gradually replaced by Eesti rahvas "Estonian people"  during the Estonian national awakening. Eesti, the modern endonym of Estonia, is thought to have similar origins with Aestii, the name used by the ancient Germanic tribes for the neighbouring people living northeast of the mouth of river Vistula. The Roman historian Tacitus in 98 CE was the first to mention the "Aestii" people in writing. In Old Norse the land south of the Gulf of Finland was called Eistland and the people eistr. The first known book in Estonian language was printed in 1525, while the oldest known examples of written Estonian originate in 13th-century chronicles.

National consciousness

Although Estonian national consciousness spread in the course of the 19th century during the Estonian national awakening, some degree of ethnic awareness preceded this development. By the 18th century the self-denomination  spread among Estonians along with the older . Anton thor Helle's translation of the Bible into Estonian appeared in 1739, and the number of books and brochures published in Estonian increased from 18 in the 1750s to 54 in the 1790s. By the end of the century more than a half of adult peasants could read. The first university-educated intellectuals identifying themselves as Estonians, including Friedrich Robert Faehlmann (1798–1850), Kristjan Jaak Peterson (1801–1822) and Friedrich Reinhold Kreutzwald (1803–1882), appeared in the 1820s. The ruling elites had remained predominantly German in language and culture since the conquest of the early 13th century. Garlieb Merkel (1769–1850), a Baltic-German Estophile, became the first author to treat the Estonians as a nationality equal to others; he became a source of inspiration for the Estonian national movement, modelled on Baltic German cultural world before the middle of the 19th century. However, in the middle of the century, the Estonians became more ambitious and started leaning toward the Finns as a successful model of national movement and, to some extent, toward the neighbouring Latvian national movement. By the end of 1860 the Estonians became unwilling to reconcile with German cultural and political hegemony. Before the attempts at Russification in the 1880s, their view of Imperial Russia remained positive.

Estonians have strong ties to the Nordic countries stemming from important cultural and religious influences gained over centuries during Scandinavian and German rule and settlement. Indeed, Estonians consider themselves Nordic rather than Baltic, in particular because of close ethnic and linguistic affinities with the Finns.

After the Treaty of Tartu (1920) recognised Estonia's 1918 independence from Russia, ethnic Estonians residing in Russia gained the option of opting for Estonian citizenship (those who opted were called optandid – 'optants') and returning to their fatherland. An estimated 40,000 Estonians lived in Russia in 1920. In sum, 37,578 people moved from Soviet Russia to Estonia (1920–1923).

Emigration
During World War II, when Estonia was invaded by the Soviet Army in 1944, large numbers of Estonians fled their homeland on ships or smaller boats over the Baltic Sea. Many refugees who survived the risky sea voyage to Sweden or Germany later moved from there to Canada, the United Kingdom, the United States or Australia. Some of these refugees and their descendants returned to Estonia after the nation regained its independence in 1991.

Over the years of independence, increasing numbers of Estonians have chosen to work abroad, primarily in Finland, but also in other European countries (mostly in the UK, Benelux, Sweden, and Germany), making Estonia the country with the highest emigration rate in Europe. This is at least partly due to the easy access to oscillating migration to Finland.

Recognising the problems arising from both low birth rate and high emigration, the country has launched various measures to both increase the birth rate and to lure migrant Estonians back to Estonia. Former president Toomas Hendrik Ilves has lent his support to the campaign Talendid koju! ("Bringing talents home!") which aims to coordinate and promote the return of Estonians who have particular skills needed in Estonia.

Estonians in Canada
One of the largest permanent Estonian community outside Estonia is in Canada with about 24,000 people (according to some sources up to 50,000 people). In the late 1940s and early 1950s, about 17,000 arrived in Canada, initially to Montreal. Toronto is currently the city with the largest population of Estonians outside of Estonia. The first Estonian World Festival was held in Toronto in 1972. Some notable Estonian Canadians include Endel Tulving, Elmar Tampõld, Alison Pill, Uno Prii, Kalle Lasn, and Andreas Vaikla.

Genetics 
Estonians have 49.5% haplogroup R1a and 34% haplogroup N1c.

See also
 Demographics of Estonia
 Estonian Americans
 Estonian Argentines
 Estonian Australians
 Estonian Canadians
 Estonian national awakening
 Gauja Estonians
 List of Estonian Americans
 List of notable Estonians

Notes

References

Further reading

External links

 Office of the Minister for Population and Ethnic Affairs: Estonians abroad
 From Estonia to Thirlmere (online exhibition)
 Our New Home Meie Uus Kodu: Estonian-Australian Stories (online exhibition)

 
Ethnic groups in Estonia
Baltic Finns